Pema Gyamtsho (Dzongkha: པདྨ་རྒྱ་མཚོ།, Wylie: pad+ma rgya mtsho, born in 1961) is a Bhutanese politician who served as the Second Party President of the Bhutan Peace and Prosperity Party and Opposition Leader in the National Assembly of Bhutan from 2013 until his resignation to become the Director General of ICIMOD in 2020. He also served as the Minister of Agriculture and Forests in the first elected government of Bhutan.

Career 
He had already found employment when he was 18 years old. In 1990, he took M.Agr.Sc (Hons) from New Zealand, and in 1996 he took Ph.D. from ETH Zurich. He was a member of the Planning Commission, Sustainable Development Secretariat, Centre for Bhutan Studies, Forestry Development Corporation Board and Founding Co-Chairman of Bhutan Water Partnership. Later he was promoted to the Deputy Secretary of Policy Planning Division, Ministry of Agriculture. He has also worked with ICIMOD based in Kathmandu, Nepal as a specialist in watershed.  Ultimately he became the Deputy Resident Coordinator of Helvetas Swiss Intercooperation.

In 2007, he became a member of DPT, and his name was registered in the constituency of Bumthang District for the General Election (the election of National Assembly). In March 2008, he won a clear victory in his constituency, and in April same year he was appointed the First Minister of Agriculture and Forest in the Democratic Government of Bhutan. In 2013, he ran for re-election in the General Election. While DPT was beaten by People's Democratic Party (PDP) in this election, he was elected the Member for the second term.

In July 2013, Jigme Thinley who had been the former Prime Minister and the Party President of DPT submitted the resignation for the Member of National Assembly before beginning its Legislative Session. So on 24 July same year Pema Gyamtsho was appointed the Opposition Leader in NA for the Second Legislative Session. On 3 December same year he was also elected as the new DPT's Party President.

Honours
  :
  The Royal Orange Scarf (7 November 2018).

References

Footnotes 
 Gyambo Sithey & Dr. Tandin Dorji, Drukyul Decides, Centre for Research Initiative (Thimphu), 2009.

1961 births
Living people
Bhutanese MNAs 2018–2023
21st-century Bhutanese politicians
Druk Phuensum Tshogpa politicians
Bhutanese politicians
Bhutanese MNAs 2013–2018
Bhutanese MNAs 2008–2013
Druk Phuensum Tshogpa MNAs